Blanche Wolf Knopf (July 30, 1894 – June 4, 1966) was the president of Alfred A. Knopf, Inc., and wife of publisher Alfred A. Knopf Sr., with whom she established the firm in 1915. Blanche traveled the world seeking new authors and was especially influential in the publication of European and Latin American literature in the United States.

Biography

Family and early life
Blanche Wolf was born in 1894 on the Upper West Side of New York City to to a Jewish family; her parents were Julius and Bertha (née Samuels) Wolf. Blanche told others that Julius had been a jeweler in Vienna but in fact he had been a day laborer in Bavaria. After coming to America, he co-owned a millinery business (from which he divested before it went bankrupt), and later he owned the second largest children's hat company in the country. Her mother, Bertha, was the daughter of Lehman Samuels who co-owned Samuels Brothers, which was at one point the largest exporter of cattle in America.

Blanche attended the Gardner School for Girls on the Upper East Side of New York City.

Blanche was introduced to Alfred A. Knopf at a party at the Lawrence Athletic Club in Lawrence, New York, in 1911. Their relationship was built on their mutual interest in books. Blanche said of their relationship, "Alfred had realized I read books constantly and he had never met a girl who did.... I saw him and [all we did was] talk books, and nobody liked him — my family least of all. But I did, because I had someone to talk books to and we talked of making books.... We decided we would get married and make books and publish them." They were married on April 4, 1916, at the St. Regis Hotel in New York. Their first home, which they called Sans Souci (meaning carefree), was in Hartsdale, New York.

Their son, Alfred A. Knopf Jr., known as "Pat", was born on June 17, 1918. After Pat's birth, Blanche and Alfred moved back to Manhattan.

Alfred A. Knopf, Inc.
Knopf launched Alfred A. Knopf, Inc. with Alfred Knopf in New York in 1915. She learned the mechanics of printing and publishing and went on to become a highly influential editor. Knopf is credited with designing the Borzoi, a Russian wolfhound imprint marking Knopf titles. She became the vice president of the company when it was incorporated in 1918. She often clashed with Alfred's father, Sam Knopf, who was named Treasurer when the firm was incorporated. Knopf became president of Alfred A. Knopf, Inc. in 1957 when Alfred Knopf became the chairman.

Knopf frequently traveled to Europe and Latin America to meet foreign authors and publishers.  She is credited with recruiting Sigmund Freud, Albert Camus, André Gide, Jean-Paul Sartre, Simone de Beauvoir, Ilya Ehrenburg, Mikhail Sholokhov, Thomas Mann, and Gilberto Freyre, striking deals to publish translations of their works in the United States.

In 1936 Blanche Knopf returned from Europe concerned about the plight of German publishers and authors driven out of Germany because of Nazi persecution. Knopf told the reporter, "There's not a German writer left in Germany who is worth thinking about. The gifted writers and enterprising publishers who had any independence have all left Germany. Only Nazi writers and publishers remain. They write and publish to please the Nazi Government."

Thomas Mann called Blanche Knopf, "the soul of the firm." Knopf is credited for advancing the careers of numerous authors, serving as an adviser while agreeing to publish the work of several influential authors. By the time she died, 27 Knopf authors had won the Pulitzer Prize and 16 the Nobel Prize.

Knopf also worked closely with many American writers, including John Updike, Carl Van Vechten, Willa Cather, H.L. Mencken, Raymond Chandler, Dashiell Hammett and Langston Hughes. Knopf helped Carl Van Vechten launch writers of the Harlem Renaissance including Langston Hughes and Nella Larson. According to her biography by Laura Claridge she "legitimized the genre of hard-boiled detective fiction" with authors such as Dashiell Hammet, Raymond Chandler and Ross Macdonald." Knopf was also responsible for acquiring William Shirer's Berlin Diary, John Hersey's Hiroshima and works by Edward R. Murrow.

Legacy 
For her accomplishments in developing and promoting the literature of France, she was named a Chevalier (Knight) of the Légion d'honneur by the French government in 1949, and became an Officier de la Légion d'honneur in 1960. She was also honored by Brazil with the Order of the Southern Cross.

In the TV series, Julia, based on the life of Julia Child, Knopf is portrayed by Judith Light.

Honors 
 Chevalier de la Légion d'honneur, 1949, France
 Officier de la Légion d'honneur in 1960, France 
 Order of the Southern Cross, Brazil

References

Further reading
 The Lady with the Borzoi: Blanche Knopf, Literary Tastemaker Extraordinaire by Laura Claridge, Farrar, Straus and Giroux, 2016
 Quality Lit: She Took Charge by Francine Prose May 26, 2016 The New York Review of Books, review of The Lady with the Borzoi

External links
Jewish Virtual Library profile on Blanche Wolf Knopf
Alfred A. and Blanche Knopf Library
Nickolas Muray portrait of Blanche Knopf in riding habit

American book publishers (people)
American book editors
American people of Austrian-Jewish descent
1894 births
1966 deaths
Businesspeople from New York City
Place of death missing
Chevaliers of the Légion d'honneur
Knopf family
20th-century American businesspeople